Raoul Sinier is a digital painter, film maker and electronic musician based in Paris.

Discography

as Ra
2004: Raoul Loves You (CD album, Coredump Records)
2007: Wxfdswxc2 (CD album + limited DVD, Sublight Records)
2007: Mad EP vs. Ra (UltraFood 12", Ad Noiseam)
2007: Ev.Panic Redone (CD EP & picture disc 12", Planet Mu)

as Raoul Sinier
2007: Two Heads (Mini CD EP, Disco r.Dance)
2007: Huge Samurai Radish (CD EP, Ad Noiseam)
2008: Ra Loves You Extended (Digital album reissue, Teams)
2008: Wxfdswxc2 Extended (Digital album reissue, Teams)
2008: Brain Kitchen (CD album, Ad Noiseam)
2009: Tremens Industry (CD album + DVD-video, Ad Noiseam)
2011: Cymbal Rush/Strange Teeth & Black Nails (12" EP, Oeuvre)
2011: The Melting Man (Digital EP, Tigerbeat6)
2011: Guilty Cloaks  (CD album, Ad Noiseam)
2012: Covers (Digital EP, Self-publishing)
2013: Welcome to my Orphanage (CD album, Good Citizen Factory)
2014: Remixes (CD album, Self-publishing)
2015: Late Statues (CD album, Self-publishing)
2016: Descente (CD album, Self-publishing)
2018: Death, Love & Despair (CD album, Self-publishing)
2020: The Dollmaker Tales (12" album, Self-publishing)
2023: Dreams from the Assembly Line (CD album, Self-publishing)

References

External links
 

French digital artists
French electronic musicians
Intelligent dance musicians
Living people
Year of birth missing (living people)
Planet Mu artists